Club Deportivo San Marcos de Arica, also known as San Marcos, is a Chilean professional football club based in Arica, that is a current member of the Segunda División.

The club was founded on February 14, 1978. Between 1978 and 2005, the club was called Deportes Arica. Their home games are played at the Estadio Carlos Dittborn, which has a capacity of 14,373 seats.

Honors
Primera B: 3
1981, 2012, 2014 Clausura

Segunda División Profesional
2019

Copa Campeones: 1
1982

Copa Apertura Segunda División: 1
1981

Tercera División: 1
2007

Seasons
7 seasons in Primera División
35 seasons in Primera B
2 seasons in Segunda División Profesional
2 seasons in Tercera División

See also
Chilean football league system

Players

Current squad

2021 Summer Transfers

In

Out

Managers
  Pedro García Barros (1979)
  Luis Santibáñez (2001)
  Hernán Ibarra (Dec 2010 – June 11)
  Luis Marcoleta (July 2011–14)
  Fernando Díaz (2014)
  Kenny Mamani (Interim) (2014–)

External links
 Official Club Website 

 
Association football clubs established in 1978
Sport in Arica y Parinacota Region
1978 establishments in Chile
Arica